Sir Thomas Snagge (c.1564 – 1627) of Marston Moretaine, Bedfordshire, was an English Member of Parliament and High Sheriff.

He was the eldest son of the lawyer and MP Thomas Snagge and studied law at Gray's Inn himself before succeeding his father to his Bedfordshire estates in 1593.

He sat in Parliament for a single term in 1586/87 as the MP for Bedford and was knighted by King James I in 1603. He served as a Justice of the Peace for the county and was pricked High Sheriff of Bedfordshire for 1607-08.

He died in 1627 and was buried at Marston Moretaine.  He had married a daughter of the Bedfordshire MP George Rotheram and left two sons, Thomas and Edward.

References

1560s births
1627 deaths
People from Bedfordshire
Members of Gray's Inn
Knights Bachelor
English MPs 1586–1587
High Sheriffs of Bedfordshire